Christiane Charlotte of Württemberg-Winnental (20 August 1694 – 25 December 1729) was a German princess and regent. She was regent of Brandenburg-Ansbach in 1723-1729. 

Born in Kirchheim unter Teck, her parents were Frederick Charles, Duke of Württemberg-Winnental, and his wife Margravine Eleonore Juliane of Brandenburg-Ansbach, a daughter of Albert II, Margrave of Brandenburg-Ansbach.

Christine Charlotte was also margravine of Brandenburg-Ansbach through her marriage to her cousin William Frederick, Margrave of Brandenburg-Ansbach, of the House of Hohenzollern.  She became regent of Ansbach from her husband's death in 1723 until the end of the minority of their eldest son, Charles William Frederick, in 1729. Christiane and William Frederick's other children were Eleonore (1713–1714) and Frederick Charles (1715–1716). Schloss Bruckberg was used as her sons' "educational establishment". She died in Ansbach in 1729 and is now buried in the margraves' vault in St Gumbertus's Church in Ansbach.

Ancestors

References

Bibliography 
 M. Spindler, A. Kraus: Geschichte Frankens bis zum Ausgang des 18. Jahrhunderts, München 1997. 
 A. Schödl: Frauen und dynastische Politik, 1703-1723. Die Markgräfinnen Elisabeth Sophie von Brandenburg und Christiane Charlotte von Ansbach, Plassenburg 2007. 
 A. Schödl: Christiane Charlotte. Fürstin, Mutter und Frau, Sonderdruck Nr. 7. Verein der Freunde von Triesdorf 2009

|-

1694 births
1729 deaths
House of Württemberg
Daughters of monarchs
18th-century women rulers